Juan Martínez is a Mexican sprint canoer who competed in the mid-1990s. He won a bronze medal in the C-4 1000 m event at the 1994 ICF Canoe Sprint World Championships in Mexico City.

References

Living people
Mexican male canoeists
Year of birth missing (living people)
ICF Canoe Sprint World Championships medalists in Canadian
Pan American Games medalists in canoeing
Pan American Games silver medalists for Mexico
Pan American Games bronze medalists for Mexico
Canoeists at the 1995 Pan American Games
Medalists at the 1995 Pan American Games
20th-century Mexican people